Platyja umminia is a species of moth of the family Noctuidae first described by Pieter Cramer in 1780. It is found from the Indo-Australian tropics of China, Japan, India, Sri Lanka, Myanmar to New Guinea and Queensland. It is also present on Guam. Adults have been recorded piercing fruit in Thailand and Guam.

Description
Its wingspan is about 48–60 mm. Male has bipectinate antennae with short branches. Mid and hindleg with tufts of very long hair from the femur-tibial joint. Body olivaceous red-brown. Forewings with a few grey specks. An antemedial obliquely waved dark line present. Orbicular small and dark. Reniform with dark outline. There is a postmedial crenulate line, highly excurved beyond the cell and then bent inwards to below middle of cell above two dark-edged marks, which in the female are filled in with ochreous, chestnut or white and with some chestnut rings or spots. A dark streak from apex, with some grey below it. Hindwings with crenulate postmedial line and traces of a sub-marginal line. Cilia tipped with white on both wings. Ventral sides with lines on discocellulars and a crenulate postmedial line with a white specks series on it.

Adults and caterpillars are known to feed on soursop and other Annona species.

References

External links
Australian Faunal Directory
Digital Moths of Japan

Catocalinae
Moths of Asia
Moths of Oceania